The Sârbi (also: Valea Sârbilor) is a right tributary of the river Valea Neagră in Romania. It flows into the Valea Neagră near Secuienii Noi.

References

Rivers of Romania
Rivers of Neamț County